Broadmoor is an unincorporated community in Saratoga Township, Marshall County, Illinois, United States.

References

Unincorporated communities in Marshall County, Illinois
Unincorporated communities in Illinois
Peoria metropolitan area, Illinois